The Soviet Airborne Forces or VDV (from Vozdushno-desantnye voyska SSSR, Russian: Воздушно-десантные войска СССР, ВДВ; Air-landing Forces) was a separate troops branch of the Soviet Armed Forces. First formed before the Second World War, the force undertook two significant airborne operations and a number of smaller jumps during the war and for many years after 1945 was the largest airborne force in the world. The force was split after the dissolution of the Soviet Union, with the core becoming the Russian Airborne Forces, losing divisions to Belarus and Ukraine.

Troops of the Soviet Airborne Forces traditionally wore a sky blue beret and blue-striped telnyashka and they were named desant (Russian: Десант) from the French Descente.

The Soviet Airborne Forces were noted for their relatively large number of vehicles, specifically designed for airborne transport, as such, they traditionally had a larger complement of heavy weaponry than most contemporary airborne forces.

Interwar and World War II 

The first airborne forces parachute jump is dated to 2 August 1930, taking place in the Moscow Military District. Airborne landing detachments were established after the initial 1930 experimental jump, but creation of larger units had to wait until 1932–33. On 11 December 1932, a Revolutionary Military Council order established an airborne brigade from the existing detachment in the Leningrad Military District. To implement the order, a directive of the Commissariat of Military and Naval Affairs transformed the Leningrad Military District's 3rd Motorised Airborne Landing Detachment into the  commanded by M.V. Boytsov. In addition, the 13th and 47th Airborne Brigades plus three airborne regiments (the 1st, 2nd, and 5th, all in the Far East) were created in 1936. In March and April 1941, five Airborne Corps (divisions) were established on the basis of the existing 201st, 204th, 211th, 212th, and 214th Airborne Brigades. The number of Airborne Corps rose from five to ten in late 1941, but then all the airborne corps were converted into "Guards" Rifle Divisions in the northern hemisphere summer of 1942.

The Soviet airborne forces were mostly used as 'foot' infantry during the war. Only a few small airborne drops were carried out in the first desperate days of Operation Barbarossa, in the vicinity of Kiev, Odessa, and the Kerch peninsula. The two significant airborne operations of the war were the Vyazma operation of February–March 1942, involving 4th Airborne Corps, and the Dnepr/Kiev operation of September 1943, involving a temporary corps formation consisting of 1st, 3rd, and 5th Airborne Brigades. Glantz wrote:
"After the extensive airborne activity during the winter campaign of 1941–42, [the] airborne forces underwent another major reorganization the following summer. Responding to events in southern Russia, where German troops had opened a major offensive that would culminate in the Stalingrad battles, the ten airborne corps, as part of the Stavka strategic reserves, deployed southward. Furthermore, the Stavka converted all ten airborne corps into guards rifle divisions to bolster Soviet forces in the south. Nine of these divisions participated in the battles around Stalingrad, and one took part in the defense of the northern Caucasus region."

The Stavka still foresaw the necessity of conducting actual airborne operations later during the war. To have such a force, the Stavka created eight new airborne corps (1st, 4th, 5th, 6th, 7th, 8th, 9th, and 10th) in the fall of 1942. Beginning in December 1942, these corps became ten guards airborne divisions (numbered 1st, 2nd, 3rd, 4th, 5th (formed from 9th Airborne Corps (2nd formation)), 6th, 7th, 8th, 9th, 10th, two formed from the 1st Airborne Corps and the three existing separate maneuver airborne brigades). The new guards airborne divisions trained in airborne techniques, and all personnel jumped three to ten times during training, though many were from jump towers.

After the defeat of German forces in the Battle of Kursk, the bulk of the airborne divisions joined in the pursuit of German forces to the Dnieper River which formed part of the German Panther–Wotan line which they defended. Even as ten guards airborne divisions fought at the front, new airborne brigades formed in the rear areas. In April and May 1943, twenty brigades formed and trained for future airborne operations. Most of these brigades had become six new guards airborne divisions (11th through 16th) by September 1943.

Dnieper

The Stavka earmarked three airborne brigades for use in an airborne operation as part of the crossing of the Dnieper River. 

The 1st, 3rd and 5th Guards Airborne Brigades were intended to secure the far side of the Dnieper between Kaniv and Rzhishchev. The majority were killed or captured; some survivors joined partisan groups.

David Glantz wrote in 1984:
In August [1944], the Stavka formed the 37th, 38th, and 39th Guards Airborne Corps. By October, the newly formed corps had combined into a separate airborne army under Maj. Gen. I. I. Zatevakhin. However, because of the growing need for well-trained ground units, the new army did not endure long as an airborne unit. In December, the Stavka reorganized the separate airborne army into the 9th Guards Army of Col. Gen. V. V. Glagolev, and all divisions were renumbered as guards rifle divisions. As testimony to the elite nature of airborne-trained units, the Stavka held the 9th Guards Army out of defensive actions, using it only for exploitation during offensives.

Reconstitution
From 1944 the airborne divisions were reconstituted as Guards Rifle Divisions.
 37th Guards Svirsk Airborne Corps (19 January – 9 August 1944, and from 30 December 1944, 37th Guards Rifle Corps):Lieutenant General Pavel Mironov (19 January 1944 – May 1946)
 98th Guards Svirsk Rifle Division
 99th Guards Rifle Division
 103rd Guards Rifle Division
 38th Guards Airborne Corps:
 Major General, from November 5, Lieutenant General Alexander Kapitokhin (August 9, 1944 – March 25, 1945)
 Lieutenant General Alexander Utvenko (26 March 1945 – July 1946)
104th Guards Rifle Division
105th Guards Rifle Division
106th Guards Rifle Division
 39th Guards Airborne Corps:
 Lieutenant General Mikhail Tikhonov (August 1944 – June 1945).
 100th Guards Rifle Division
107th Guards Rifle Division
114th Guards Rifle Division (from 14th Guards Airborne Division (2nd formation))

During the invasion of Manchuria and the South Sakhalin Operation, airborne units were used to seize airfields and city centers in advance of the land forces, and to ferry fuel to those units that had outrun their supply lines.

Postwar 

The HQ 9th Guards Army was redesignated Headquarters Airborne Forces in June 1946 after the war ended. The units of the army were removed from the order of battle of the Air Forces of the USSR and assigned directly to the Ministry of the Armed Forces of the USSR.

In 1946 the force consisted of five corps (the 8th and 15th had been added) and ten divisions:
 8th Guards Airborne Corps (103rd and 114th Divisions). The 114th Guards Airborne Division was established in 1946 on the basis of the similarly numbered Rifle Division in Borovukha (just east of Slutsk) in the Byelorussian SSR. The division was disbanded in 1956, with two of its regiments (the 350th and 357th) joining the 103rd Guards Airborne Division.
 15th Guards Airborne Corps (the 76th and 104th Divisions at Pskov),
 37th Guards Airborne Corps (the 98th and 99th in Primorsky Krai)
 38th Guards Airborne Corps (105th and 106th at Tula),
 39th Guards Airborne Corps at Belaya Tserkov in Ukraine (the 100th and 107th Guards Airborne Divisions (Chernigov, disbanded in 1959))

In the summer of 1948, five more Guards Airborne Divisions were created. The 7th (Lithuania, 8th Airborne Corps), the 11th (activated 1 October 1948 in Ryazan, Moscow Oblast, from the 347th Guards Air Landing Regiment, 38th Airborne Corps), the 13th Guards (at Galenki, Primorskiy Kray, with the 37th Airborne Corps), the 21st Guards (Estonia, Valga, with the 15th Airborne Corps), and the 31st Guards (Carpathians, 39th Airborne Corps). At the end of 1955 and the beginning of 1956 the 11th Guards, 21st, 100th and 114th Guards Airborne Divisions were disbanded as well as all the airborne corps headquarters. The number of divisions, thus, decreased to 11. In April 1955 the transport aircraft were separated from the VDV and the Air Force Military Transport Aviation was created. In 1959 the 31st and 107th Guards Airborne Divisions were disbanded, but in October 1960 the 44th Training Airborne Division was formed. In 1964 the Soviet Airborne Forces were directly subordinated to the Ministry of Defence.

The creation of the post-war Soviet Airborne Forces owe much to the efforts of one man, Army General Vasily Margelov, so much so that the abbreviation of VDV in the Airborne Forces is sometimes waggishly interpreted as Войска дяди Васи or "Uncle Vasya's Forces".

Airborne units of two divisions (7th and 31st Guards) were used during Soviet operations in Hungary during 1956, and the 7th Guards division was used again during the 1968 invasion of Czechoslovakia.

The first experimental air assault brigade – the 1st Airborne Brigade – was apparently activated in 1967/1968 from parts of the 51st Guards Parachute Landing Regiment (PDP) (Tula), after the Soviets had been impressed by the American experiences in Vietnam War. In 1973 the 13th and 99th Airborne Divisions were reorganised as air assault brigades, and thus the number of divisions dropped to eight. There were also independent regiments and battalions. However, even by the 1980s only two divisions were capable of being deployed for combat operations in the first wave against NATO using Air Force Military Transport Aviation and Aeroflot aircraft.

Airborne Forces Commander-in-Chief Vasily Margelov had the idea to introduce the Telnyashka blue-and-white striped shirt as a sign of elite status of the airborne troops. In 1970, the telnyashka became an official part of the uniform.

In accordance with a directive of the General Staff, from August 3, 1979, to December 1, 1979, the 105th Guards Vienna Airborne Division was disbanded. From the division remained in the city of Fergana the 345th Independent Guards Airborne Regiment (much stronger than the usual regimental size) with the separate 115th military-transport aviation squadron. The rest of the personnel of the division were reassigned to fill out other incomplete airborne units and formations and to the newly formed air assault brigades. Based on the division's 351st Guards Parachute Regiment, the 56th Guards Separate Air Assault Brigade was formed in Azadbash, (Chirchiq district) Tashkent Oblast, Uzbek SSR. Meanwhile, the 111th Guards Parachute Regiment became the 35th Separate Guards Air Assault Brigade.

However, there was also a mistaken Western belief, either intentional Soviet deception or stemming from confusion in the West, that an Airborne Division, reported as the 6th, was being maintained at Belogorsk in the Far East in the 1980s. This maskirovka division was then 'disbanded' later in the 1980s, causing comment within Western professional journals that another division was likely to be reformed so that the Far East had an airborne presence. The division was not listed in V.I. Feskov et al.'s The Soviet Army during the period of the Cold War, (2004) and the division at Belogorsk, the 98th Guards Airborne Svirskaya Red Banner Order of Kutuzov Division moved to Bolgrad in Ukraine in late 1969.

The 103rd Guards Airborne Division, 345th Independent Guards Airborne Regiment and the 56th Air Assault Brigade fought in the Soviet–Afghan War.

Units 

The Airborne Troops (Воздушно-десантные войска (ВДВ), literal translation: Air-Landing Troops) of the Soviet Union and their present-day Russian Federation successor are a separate combat service directly subordinated to the General Staff. Their combat doctrine establishes their role as a highly mobile operational reserve of the armed forces, the last remaining Reserve of the Supreme High Command (Резерв главного командования (РГК)).

In 1989 a Soviet Air-Landing Division (Воздушно-десантная дивизия (вдд)) was organized into a division headquarters, three Parachute Landing Regiments (sing. Парашютно-десантный полк (пдп)) and various combat and service support units. V. I. Shaykin's historic study of the Airborne Forces lists the following force structure in 1989 (Military Detachment number (в/ч) given in brackets):

Directorate of the Commander of the Airborne Troops (Управление командующего ВДВ)(25953), Moscow, RSFSR

 units and establishments directly subordinated to the Directorate:
 879th Signals Nod 
 196th Signals Regiment of the Airborne Troops (54164), Medvezhie Ozera, Moscow Oblast, RSFSR
 899th Spetsnaz Company (54766)
 387th Parachute Regiment (Fergana, Uzbek SSR);
 58th Military Transport Aviation Squadron (03417), Ryazan, Dyagilevo Airfield
 78th Military Transport Aviation Squadron, Klin Airfield
 Ryazan Higher Air-Landing, twice awarded the Order of the Red Banner, named after the Lenin Comsomol Command School, Ryazan, RSFSR
 332nd NCO School of the Airborne Troops, Gaižiūnai, Lithuanian SSR
 2356th Central Automobile Storage of the Airborne Troops, Kubinka, Moscow Oblast, RSFSR
 3104th Central Base for Armament and Equipment Reserve of the Airborne Troops, Orekhovo-Zuyevo, Moscow Oblast, RSFSR
 5730th Central Base for Armored Vehicles of the Airborne Troops, Naro-Fominsk, Moscow Oblast, RSFSR
 3370th Central Storage for Air-Landing Equipment of the Airborne Troops, Kolomna, Moscow Oblast, RSFSR
 1029th Central Military Hospital of the Airborne Troops (52203), Tula, RSFSR
 984th Center for Sanitary-Epidemiological Oversight of the Airborne Troops (48837), Ivanovo, RSFSR
 176th Central Sanitary-Epidemiological Detachment 
 Military Sanatorium "Gudautskiy" 
 Military Sanatorium "Airborne Trooper" 
 47th Singing and Dancing Ensemble of the Airborne Troops 
 242nd Training Centre of the Airborne Troops, created from the 44th Training Airborne Division. However, the divisional banner was retained. The division was established in Ostrov in September 1960 as the 44th Training Airborne Division. In September 1961 it was transferred to the Lithuanian SSR.
 Center HQ 20192), Gaižiūnai, Lithuanian SSR
 300th Training Signals Battalion (63295), Gaižiūnai, Lithuanian SSR
 226th Training Parachute Regiment (11929), Gaižiūnai, Lithuanian SSR
 285th Training Parachute Regiment (74995), Gaižiūnai, Lithuanian SSR
 301st Training Parachute Regiment (42227), Gaižiūnai, Lithuanian SSR
 743rd Training Parachute Battalion, Karmėlava, Lithuanian SSR
 1120th Training Self-Propelled Artillery Regiment (61222), Prienai, Lithuanian SSR
 367th Training Air Defence Missile and Artillery Battalion (33817), Gaižiūnai, Lithuanian SSR
 113th Training Combat Engineer Battalion (63291), Gaižiūnai, Lithuanian SSR
 340th Military Transport Aviation Squadron, Pociūnai Airfield (near Prienai), Lithuanian SSR
 148th Training Battalion for Heavy Air Landing Vehicles Familiarization (74163), Gaižiūnai, Lithuanian SSR
 45th Training Repair and Overhaul Battalion (59356), Gaižiūnai, Lithuanian SSR
 184th Training Medical Battalion (42235), Gaižiūnai, Lithuanian SSR
 373rd Training Automobile Battalion, Gaižiūnai, Lithuanian SSR
 214th Training Range 
 2945th Unified Storage
 51518th Field Branch of Gosbank
7th Guards Cherkasskaya, awarded the Order of the Red Banner and the Order of Kutuzov Air Assault Division
Division Command and Staff, Kaunas, Lithuanian SSR
743rd Signals Battalion (02050), Kaunas, Lithuanian SSR
97th Guards Parachute Regiment (10999), Alytus, Lithuanian SSR
108th Guards, Kuban Cossack, awarded the Order of the Red Star Parachute-Landing Regiment (02291), Kaunas, Lithuanian SSR
119th Guards Parachute-Landing Regiment (10075), Marijampolė, Lithuanian SSR
1141st Guards Artillery Regiment (02207), Kalvarija, Lithuanian SSR
744th Air Defence Missile and Artillery Battalion (33817), Kaunas, Lithuanian SSR
72nd Reconnaissance Company (86788), Kaunas, Lithuanian SSR
143rd Combat Engineer Battalion Kazlų Rūda, Lithuanian SSR
185th Military Transport Aviation Squadron, Kaunas, Lithuanian SSR
1692nd Air-Landing Equipment Maintenance Battalion (96536), Kaunas, Lithuanian SSR
1681st Supply Battalion , Kaunas, Lithuanian SSR
6th Repair and Overhaul Battalion (58356), Kaunas, Lithuanian SSR
313th Medical Battalion, Kaunas, Lithuanian SSR
286th Station of the Field Courier Service
215th Training Range (63319), Kazlų Rūda, Lithuanian SSR
51502nd Field Branch of Gosbank 
76th Guards Chernigovskaya, awarded the Order of the Red Banner Air Assault Division
Division Command and Staff, Pskov, RSFSR
728th Separate Guards Signals Battalion (24538)
104th Guards Parachute Regiment (32515), Cheryokha, suburb of Pskov, RSFSR
234th Guards Parachute Regiment (74268), Pskov, RSFSR
237th Guards Parachute Regiment (56264), Pskov, RSFSR
1140th Guards, twice awarded the Order of the Red Banner Artillery Regiment
165th Air Defence Missile and Artillery Battalion (81430)
175th Guards Reconnaissance Company (64004)
656th Combat Engineer Battalion (45293)
242nd Military Transport Aviation Squadron (06776), Cheryokha, suburb of Pskov, RSFSR
608th Airborne Equipment Maintenance Battalion (77011)
1682nd Supply Battalion (42689)
7th Repair and Overhaul Battalion 
586th Medical Battalion 
 98th Guards Svirskaya, awarded the Order of the Red Banner and the Order of Kutuzov Airborne Division
Division Command and Staff (штаб дивизии), Bolgrad, Odessa Oblast, Ukrainian SSR
674th Separate Guards Signals Battalion (89592), Bolgrad
217th Guards Parachute Regiment (42246), Bolgrad
299th Guards Parachute Regiment (52432), Bolgrad
300th Guards Parachute Regiment (40390), Kishinev, Moldovan SSR
1065th Guards Artillery Regiment (31539), Vessyolliy Kut, Odessa Oblast, Ukrainian SSR
100th Air Defence Missile and Artillery Battalion (73512), Bolgrad
215th Guards Reconnaissance Company (03391)
112th Combat Engineer Battalion 
243rd Military Transport Aviation Squadron(68226)
613th Air-Landing Equipment Maintenance Battalion 
1683rd Supply Battalion 
15th Repair and Overhaul Battalion 
176th Medical Battalion 
728th Station of the Field Courier Service (36477)
? Training Range, Tarutino, Odessa Oblast, Ukrainian SSR
 103rd Guards, awarded the Order of Lenin, the Order of the Combat Red Banner, the Order of Kutuzov II class Airborne Division "60th Anniversary of the USSR" 
Division Command and Staff (07197), Vitebsk, Belorussian SSR
742nd Signals Battalion 
317th Guards Parachute Regiment (52287, г. Витебск), Vitebsk, Byelorussian SSR
350th Guards Parachute Regiment (64222, г. Полоцк), Polotsk, Vitebsk Oblast, Byelorussian SSR
357th Guards Parachute Regiment (93684, г. Полоцк), Polotsk, Vitebsk Oblast, Byelorussian SSR
62nd Tank Battalion
1179th Artillery Regiment 
133th Anti-Tank Artillery Battalion (133-й отдельный противотанковый артиллерийский дивизион)
105th Air Defence Missile and Artillery Battalion (105-й отдельный зенитный ракетно-артиллерийский дивизион)
80th Reconnaissance Company (80-я отдельная разведывательная рота)(86793)
130th Combat Engineer Battalion (130-й отдельный инженерно-саперный батальон)
210th Military Transport Aviation Squadron (210-я отдельная военно-транспортная авиационная эскадрилья)
1388th Supply Battalion (1388-й отдельный батальон материального обеспечения)
20th Repair and Overhaul Battalion (20-й отдельный ремонтно-восстановительный батальон)(59318)
175th Medical Battalion (175-й отдельный медицинский батальон)
274th Automobile Company (274-я отдельная автомобильная рота)
 104th Guards, awarded the Order of the Combat Red Banner and the Order of Kutuzov II class Airborne Division 
Division Command and Staff, Kirovabad, Azerbaijan SSR
729th Signals Battalion (12192), Kirovabad, Azerbaijan SSR
328th Guards Parachute Regiment (93626), Kirovabad, Azerbaijan SSR
337th Guards Parachute Regiment, Kirovabad, Azerbaijan SSR
(345th Guards Airborne Regiment, Kirovabad, Azerbaijan SSR
1080th Guards Artillery Regiment (73598), Şəmkir, Azerbaijan SSR
103rd Air Defence Missile and Artillery Battalion 
110th Reconnaissance Company  (64009), Kirovabad, Azerbaijan SSR
132nd Combat Engineer Battalion (71296), Kirovabad, Azerbaijan SSR
116th Military Transport Aviation Squadron 
611th Air-Landing Equipment Maintenance Battalion 
1684th Supply Battalion 
24th Repair and Overhaul Battalion 
180th Medical Battalion 
422nd Station of the Field Courier Service 
106th Guards, awarded the Order of the Red Banner and the Order of Kutuzov Airborne Division 
Division Command and Staff (55599), Tula, RSFSR
731st Signals Battalion (93687)
51st Guards Parachute Regiment (в/ч 33842), Tula, RSFSR
137th Guards Parachute Regiment (в/ч 41450), Ryazan, RSFSR
331st Guards Parachute Regiment, Kostroma, RSFSR
1182nd Guards Artillery Regiment (93723), Efremov, Tula Oblast, RSFSR
107th Air Defence Missile and Artillery Battalion (71298)
181st Reconnaissance Company (86800)
139th Combat Engineer Battalion (12159)
110th Military Transport Aviation Squadron (25500)
610th Airborne  Equipment Maintenance Battalion (64024)
1060th Supply Battalion (14403)
43rd Repair and Overhaul Battalion (28393)
234th Medical Battalion (52296)
1883rd Station of the Field Courier Service (54235)

As a high readiness and long range main operational reserve of the General Staff the Airborne Troops could rely on the support of the whole Military Transport Aviation and Aeroflot aircraft mobilized for military service. The Airborne Troops also had their own organic aviation assets, but these had very limited airlift capabilities (Antonov An-2s and Mil Mi-8s) and were used for parachute training and liaison flights between the various units.

Landing Assault units of the Soviet Ground Forces 
Around the time of the strategic Exercise Dnepr-67 (:ru:Днепр (учения)) came the organization of the first Soviet air assault formation. Shortly before it the 51st Guards Parachute-Landing Regiment (51-й гв. пдп) was transformed into the 1st Separate Air Assault Brigade (1-я отдельная Воздушно-штурмовая бригада (1-я овшбр)) and this experimental formation was put under the command of Major General Kobzar', Chief of the Combat Training Department of the Airborne Forces HQ. The task of the brigade in the massive exercise was to land with helicopters on the riverside of the River Dnieper and secure a beachhead for the forcing of the river by the main forces. This was executed successfully and the lessons learned were used for the formation of regular air assault brigades. A General Staff Directive from May 22, 1968, ordered the formation of the first brigades. They were under the Soviet Ground Forces and by August 1970 the first two active brigades were:

 13th Air Assault Brigade (13-я отдельная Воздушно-штурмовая бригада (13-я овшбр)) in the villages of Nikolayevka and Zavitinsk, Amur Oblast, under the Far Eastern Military District and the
 11th Air Assault Brigade (11-я отдельная Воздушно-штурмовая бригада (11-я овшбр)) in the village of Mogocha, Chita Oblast, under the Transbaikal Military District.

These brigades had organic aviation units and had the following structure:

 Brigade HQ (управление бригады)
 3x Separate Air Assault Battalions (три отдельные воздушно-штурмовые батальоны)
 Artillery Battalion (артиллерийский дивизион)
 Air Defence Artillery Battalion (зенитно-артиллерийский дивизион)
 Combat Helicopter Regiment with its own Aviation Base (боевой вертолетный полк с авиационной базой)
 Transport Helicopter Regiment with its own Aviation Base (транспортный вертолетный полк с авиационной базой)
 Brigade logistics (тыл бригады)

Each aviation base consisted of an airfield support battalion and a signals and radio-technical support battalion. The brigade was tasked with executing tactical heliborne landings up to 100 km behind enemy lines. In the beginning of the 1970s the designation was changed from Separate Air Assault Brigade (отдельная воздушно-штурмовая бригада (овшбр)) to Separate Landing Assault Brigade (отдельная десантно-штурмовая бригада (одшбр)). In 1973 a third brigade was formed:

 21st Separate Landing Assault Brigade (21-я одшбр)) in the Georgian city of Kutaisi under the Transcaucasian Military District.

The experimental 1st Separate Air Assault Brigade was fully staffed by Airborne Troops personnel due to its background, but the regular air assault brigades formed afterwards  lacked any airborne parachute training and the majority of their officers came from the higher schools of the Ground Forces. The brigades carried the uniform of the motor rifle branch. In 1973 the landing assault brigades received a new table of organization:

 Brigade HQ (управление бригады) of 326 men;
 3x Separate Landing Assault Battalions (три отдельные десантно-штурмовые батальоны) of 349 men each;
 Separate Artillery Battalion (отдельный артиллерийский дивизион) of 171 men;
 Aviation Group (авиационная группа) of 805 men;
 Separate Signals and Radio-technical Support Battalion (отдельный дивизион связи и радио-технического обеспечения) of 190 men;
 Separate Airfield Technical Support Battalion (отдельный батальон аэродромно-технического обеспечения) of 410 men.

The new air assault brigades were deemed successful and by the end of the 1970s several more brigades were formed under the military districts. In addition several separate landing assault battalions were formed as assets of combined arms and tank armies. In 1983 these forces started receiving parachute training and this put them under the training oversight of the Airborne Troops. The rapid expansion of the landing assault troops led to the disbanding of one airborne division in 1979. This was the 105th Guards Venskaya, awarded the Order of the Red Banner Airborne Landing Division (105-я гвардейская воздушно-десантная Венская Краснознаменная дивизия) with HQ in Fergana in the Fergana Valley, Uzbekistan SSR and command of the 111th, 345th, 351st and the 383rd Parachute Landing Regiments and additional support units. The division was specialized in warfare in mountain and arid regions and the decision to disband it proved to be a seriously misguided one in the coming Soviet–Afghan War. The division gave birth to the following formations:

 The 345th Parachute Landing Regiment (345-й пдп) retained its airborne qualification and remained deployed at the southern border of the USSR, reformed into the 345th Separate Parachute Landing Regiment. 
 The 111th Parachute Landing Regiment (111-й пдп) based in Osh, Kirgiz SSR was used as the basis for the formation of the 14th Guards Separate Landing Assault Brigade (14-я гв одшбр) of the Western Group of Forces in Cottbus, GDR. In December 1979 the brigade was re-numbered from the 14th to the 35th Guards Separate Landing Assault Brigade (35-я гв одшбр). 
 The 351st Parachute Landing Regiment (351-й пдп) was used for the formation of the 56th Guards Separate Landing Assault Brigade (56-я гв одшбр) of the Turkestan Military District with brigade HQ in the village of Azadbash near Chirchik, Uzbek SSR. 
 The 383rd Parachute Landing Regiment (383-й пдп) based in the village of Aktogay, Taldy-Kurgan Oblast, Kazakh SSR was used for the formation of the 57th Separate Landing Assault Brigade (57-я одшбр) of the Central Asian Military District. The regiment was also used for the formation of the 58th Separate Landing Assault Brigade in Kremenchug of the Kiev Military District, but it was kept as a cadre formation in peacetime.
 The officers of the division HQ were used as the cadre for the formation of the 38th Separate Guards Venskaya, awarded the Order of the Red Banner Landing Assault Brigade (38-я отдельная Гвардейская Венская Краснознаменная десантно-штурмовая бригада) in Brest, subordinated to the Belorussian Military District.

From the late 1970s to the 1980s, 13 separate landing assault brigades were activated. These brigades provided air-mobile capability for military districts and groups of forces. In 1989, these brigades transferred to control of the VDV. During the same period, 19 separate landing assault battalions were activated. These battalions originally provided air-mobile capability to armies and other formations but were mostly disbanded in 1989.

In 1979, the 58th Air Assault Brigade was activated as a mobilization unit in Kremenchug. It was co-located with the 23rd Air Assault Brigade from 1986 and disbanded in 1989. The 128th Air Assault Brigade existed between 1986 and 1989 as a mobilization unit in Stavropol. The 130th Air Assault Brigade existed between 1986 and 1989 as a mobilization unit in Abakan.

11th Landing Assault Brigade (Mogocha, Transbaikal MD)
 13th Landing Assault Brigade (Magdagachi, Far Eastern MD)
21st Landing Assault Brigade (Kutaisi, Transcaucasian MD)
 23rd Landing Assault Brigade (Kremenchug, Southwestern TVD)
 35th Guards Landing Assault Brigade (Cottbus, Group of Soviet Forces in Germany)
36th Landing Assault Brigade (Garbolovo, Leningrad MD)
37th Landing Assault Brigade (Chernyakhovsk, Baltic MD)
 38th Guards Landing Assault Brigade (Brest, Belarusian MD)
39th Landing Assault Brigade (Khyriv, Carpathian MD)
40th Landing Assault Brigade (Nikolaev, Odessa MD)
 56th Landing Assault Brigade (Ýolöten, Turkestan MD)
57th Landing Assault Brigade (Aktogay, Central Asian MD)
83rd Landing Assault Brigade (Byałogard, Polish People's Republic)

Experimental Landing Assault units of the Ground Forces 
In addition to the Landing Assault units of the Ground Forces' military districts and armies, the Soviet General Staff also experimented with the inclusion of landing assault units in experimental combined arms corps. Two such corps were formed in the mid-1980s with the task to exploit and widen the operational breakthrough in offensive operations.

 In the Belorussian Military District the 120th Guards, Rogachyovskaya, awarded the Order of the Red Banner, the Order of Suvorov and the Order of Kutuzov Motor Rifle Division (120-я гвардейская мотострелковая Рогачёвская Краснознамённая, орденов Суворова и Кутузова дивизия) was transformed into the 5th Guards Combined Arms Army Corps'"Supreme Soviet of the Byelorussian SSR" (5-й отдельный Гвардейский общевойсковой армейский Рогачевский Краснознаменный орденов Суворова и Кутузова корпус им. Верховного Совета БССР.
 In the Transbaikal Military District the 5th Guards, Budapeshtenskaya, awarded the Order of the Red Banner, Don Cossacks Tank Division (5-я Гвардейская танковая Будапештская Краснознамённая Донская казачья дивизия) was transformed into the 48th Guards Combined Arms Army Corps (48-й Гвардейский общевойсковой армейский корпус).

Each corps consisted of a corps HQ, two tank brigades, two mechanised brigades, a landing assault regiment of two battalions and support units and a helicopter regiment (organized into an HQ, a Mi-24 attack squadron, a Mi-8 assault squadron and a Mi-26 heavy transport squadron of 20 aircraft each). The combat and service support units were similar to those found in a tank or motor rifle division. The 5th Corps had the 1318th Separate Landing Assault Regiment and 276th Separate Helicopter Regiment, while the 48th Corps had the 1319th Separate Landing Assault Regiment and 373rd Separate Helicopter Regiment. Around 1987-88 the two corps were disbanded and reverted to divisions, losing their landing troops and helicopters.

Force Structure of the Soviet Airborne Forces in 1989 
V. I. Shaykin lists the following force structure of the Soviet airborne forces in 1989 in his study:

 General Staff of the Soviet Armed Forces
 Soviet Airborne Troops High Command (Главное командование воздушно-десантных войск) - Moscow, RSFSR
 7th Guards Cherkasskaya, awarded the Order of the Red Banner and the Order of Kutuzov Air-Landing Division - Kaunas, Lithuanian SSR
 76th Guards Chernigovskaya, awarded the Order of the Red Banner Air-Landing Division - Pskov, RSFSR
 98th Guards Svirskaya, awarded the Order of the Red Banner and the Order of Kutuzov Air-Landing Division - Bolgrad, Ukrainian SSR (one parachute landing regiment in Kishinev, Moldavian SSR)
 103rd Guards, awarded the Order of Lenin, the Order of the Combat Red Banner, the Order of Kutuzov II degree, named In Commemoration of the 60th Anniversary of the USSR Air-Landing Division - Vitebsk, Byelorussian SSR
 104th Guards, awarded the Order of the Combat Red Banner and the Order of Kutuzov II degree Air-Landing Division - Kirovabad, Azerbaijan SSR
 106th Guards, awarded the Order of the Red Banner and the Order of Kutuzov Air-Landing Division - Tula, RSFSR
 Ground Forces (Landing Assault Troops)
 High Command of the Forces of the Western Strategic Direction (Главное командование войск Западного направления) - Legnica, Polish People's Republic
 directly subordinated: 83rd Separate Landing Assault Brigade (83-я отдельная десантно-штурмовая бригада) - Białogard, Polish People's Republic
 Western Group of Forces (Западная группа войск) - Wünsdorf, German Democratic Republic
 directly subordinated: 35th Separate Landing Assault Brigade (35-я отдельная десантно-штурмовая бригада) - Cottbus, German Democratic Republic
 20th Guards Combined Arms Army (20-я гвардейская общевойсковая армия) - Magdeburg, German Democratic Republic
 899th Separate Landing Assault Battalion (899-й отдельный десантно-штурмовой батальон) - Burg bei Magdeburg, German Democratic Republic
 8th Guards Army (8-я гвардейская армия) - Nohra, GDR
 900th Separate Landing Assault Battalion (900-й отдельный десантно-штурмовой батальон) - Leipzig, German Democratic Republic
 1st Guards Tank Army (1-я гвардейская танковая армия) - Dresden, GDR
 1044th Separate Landing Assault Battalion (1044-й отдельный десантно-штурмовой батальон) - Königsbrück, German Democratic Republic
 2nd Guards Tank Army (2-я гвардейская танковая армия) - Fürstenberg/Havel, German Democratic Republic
 1185th Separate Landing Assault Battalion (1185-й отдельный десантно-штурмовой батальон) - Ravensbrück, German Democratic Republic
 Central Group of Forces (Центральная группа войск) - Milovice, Czechia, Czechoslovak People's Republic
 901st Separate Landing Assault Battalion (901-й отдельный десантно-штурмовый батальон) - Nové Zámky, Slovakia, Czechoslovak People's Republic
 Northern Group of Forces (Северная группа войск) - Legnica, Polish People's Republic
 none (the 83rd Separate Landing Assault Brigade is located in the NGF area of responsibility)
 Belorussian Military District (Белорусский военный округ) - Minsk, Belorussian SSR
 directly subordinated: 38th Separate Landing Assault Brigade (38-я отдельная десантно-штурмовая бригада) - Brest, Byelorussian SSR
 28th Combined Arms Army (28-й общевойсковая армия) - Grodno, Byelorussian SSR
 903rd Separate Landing Assault Battalion (903-й отдельный десантно-штурмовой батальон) - Grodno, Byelorussian SSR
 5th Guards Tank Army (5-я гвардейская танковая армия) - Bobruysk, Mogylev Oblast, Byelorussian SSR
 1011th Separate Landing Assault Battalion (1011-й отдельный десантно-штурмовой батальон) - Marjina Gorka, Minsk Oblast, Byelorussian SSR
 7th Red Banner Tank Army (7-я краснознамённая танковая армия) - Borisov, Minsk Oblast, Byelorussian SSR
 1151st Separate Landing Assault Battalion (1151-й отдельный десантно-штурмовой батальон) - Polotsk, Vitebsk Oblast, Byelorussian SSR
 5th Separate Guards Army Corps (5-й отдельный гвардейский армейский корпус) - Minsk, Byelorussian SSR
 1318th Separate Landing Assault Regiment (1318-й отдельный десантно-штурмовой полк) - Polotsk, Vitebsk Oblast, Byelorussian SSR
 Carpathian Military District (Прикарпатский военный округ) - 
 directly subordinated: 39th Separate Landing Assault Brigade (39-я отдельная десантно-штурмовая бригада) - Khyrov, Ukrainian SSR
 13th Combined Arms Army (13-я общевойсковая армия) - Rovno, Ukrainian SSR
 904th Separate Landing Assault Battalion (904-й отдельный десантно-штурмовой батальон) - Volodymyr-Volynskyi, Volynskyi Oblast, Ukrainian SSR
 8th Tank Army (8-я танковая армия) - Zhytomyr, Ukrainian SSR
 1156th Separate Landing Assault Battalion (1156-й отдельный десантно-штурмовой батальон) - Novigrad-Volynskyi, Zhytomyr Oblast, Ukrainian SSR
 38th Combined Arms Army (38-й общевойсковая армия) - Ivano-Frankovsk, Ukrainian SSR
 1603rd Separate Landing Assault Battalion (1603-й отдельный десантно-штурмовой батальон) - Nadvornaya, Ivano-Frankovsk Oblast, Ukrainian SSR
 High Command of the Forces of the South-Western Strategic Direction (Главное командование войск Юго-Западного направления) - Kishinev, Moldavian SSR
 directly subordinated: 23rd Separate Landing Assault Brigade (23-я отдельная десантно-штурмовая бригада)(partially cadred, the HQ, one AAslt battalion, the artillery battalion and the support units active) - Kremenchug, Ukrainian SSR
 Southern Group of Forces (Южная группа войск) - Budapest, Hungarian People's Republic
 902nd Separate Landing Assault Battalion (902-й отдельный десантно-штурмовой батальон) - Kecskemét, Hungarian People's Republic
 Kiev Military District (Киевский военный округ) - Kiev, Ukrainian SSR
 directly subordinated: 58th Separate Landing Assault Brigade (58-я отдельная десантно-штурмовая бригада)(cadred brigade, only brigade HQ of no more than 20 men active) - Kremenchug, Ukrainian SSR
 1st Guards Combined Arms Army (1-я гвардейская общевойсковая армия) - Chernigov, Ukrainian SSR
 908th Separate Landing Assault Battalion (908-й отдельный десантно-штурмовой батальон) - Goncharovskoye, Chernigov Oblast, Ukrainian SSR
 Odessa Military District (Одесский военный округ) - Odessa, Ukrainian SSR
 directly subordinated: 40th Separate Landing Assault Brigade (40-я отдельная десантно-штурмовая бригада) - Bol'shaya Korenikha, Nikolayev Oblast Ukrainian SSR
 14th Guards Combined Arms Army (14-я гвардейская общевойсковая армия) - Tiraspol, Moldavian SSR
 903rd Separate Landing Assault Battalion (903-й отдельный десантно-штурмовой батальон) - Bendery, Moldavian SSR
 High Command of the Forces of the Southern Strategic Direction (Главное командование войск Южного направления) - Baku, Azerbaijan SSR
 directly subordinated: 128th Separate Landing Assault Brigade (128-я отдельная десантно-штурмовая бригада)(cadred brigade, only brigade HQ of no more than 20 men active) - Stavropol, RSFSR
 North Caucasus Military District (Северо-Кавказский военный округ) - Rostov-on-Don
 none
 Transcaucasian Military District (Закавказский военный округ) - Tbilisi, Georgian SSR
 21st Separate Landing Assault Brigade (21-я отдельная десантно-штурмовая бригада)HH - Kutaisi, Georgian SSR
 Turkestan Military District (Туркестанский военный округ) - Tashkent, Turkestan SSR
 56th Separate Landing Assault Brigade (56-я отдельная гвардейская десантно-штурмовая бригада) - Chirchiq, Uzbek SSR
 High Command of the Forces of the Far East (Главное командование войск Дальнего Востока) - Ulan-Ude, RSFSR
 directly subordinated: 130th Separate Landing Assault Brigade (130-я отдельная десантно-штурмовая бригада)(cadred brigade, only brigade HQ of no more than 20 men active) - Abakan, Khakassian ASSR, RSFSR
 Far Eastern Military District (Дальневосточный военный округ) - Khabarovsk, Khabarovsk Krai, RSFSR
 directly subordinated: 13th Separate Landing Assault Brigade (13-я отдельная десантно-штурмовая бригада)HH - Magdagachi, Amur Oblast, RSFSR
 5th Combined Arms Army (5-я общевойсковая армия) - Ussuriysk, Primorskiy Krai, RSFSR
 1605th Separate Landing Assault Battalion (1605-й отдельный десантно-штурмовой батальон) - Spassk-Dalny, Primorskiy Krai, RSFSR
 15th Combined Arms Army (15-я общевойсковая армия) - ZATO Khabarovsk-41, Khabarovsk Krai, RSFSR
 1635th Separate Landing Assault Battalion (1635-й отдельный десантно-штурмовой батальон) - ZATO Khabarovsk-41, Khabarovsk Krai, RSFSR
 43rd Army Corps (43-й армейский корпус) - Birobidzhan, Jewish AO, RSFSR
 907th Separate Landing Assault Battalion (907-й отдельный десантно-штурмовой батальон) - Birobidzhan, Jewish AO, RSFSR
 Transbaikal Military District (Забайкальский военный округ) - Chita Oblast, RSFSR
 directly subordinated: 11th Separate Landing Assault Brigade (11-я отдельная десантно-штурмовая бригада)HH - Mogocha, Chita Oblast, RSFSR
 36th Combined Arms Army (36-я общевойсковая армия) - Borzya, Chita Oblast, RSFSR
 906th Separate Landing Assault Battalion (906-й отдельный десантно-штурмовой батальон) - Hada-Bulak, Chita Oblast, RSFSR
 29th Combined Arms Army (29-я общевойсковая армия) - Ulan-Ude, Buryat ASSR, RSFSR
 1154th Separate Landing Assault Battalion (1154-й отдельный десантно-штурмовой батальон) - Shelekhov, Irkutsk Oblast, RSFSR
 39th Combined Arms Army (39-я общевойсковая армия) - Ulaanbaatar, Mongolian People's Republic
 1609th Separate Landing Assault Battalion (1609-й отдельный десантно-штурмовой батальон) - Mandalgovi, Mongolian People's Republic
 48th Separate Guards Army Corps (48-й отдельный гвардейский армейский корпус) - Kyakhta, Buryat ASSR, RSFSR
 1319th Separate Landing Assault Regiment (1319-й отдельный десантно-штурмовой полк) - Sudzha (21 km away from Kyakhta), Buryat ASSR, RSFSR
 Internal Military Districts directly subordinated to the General Staff
 Moscow Military District (Московский военный округ) - Moscow, RSFSR
 none (106th Air Landing Division of the VDV based in Tula in the District's AOR)
 Leningrad Military District (Ленинградский военный округ) - Leningrad, RSFSR
 36th Separate Landing Assault Brigade (36-я отдельная десантно-штурмовая бригада) - Garbolovo, Leningrad Oblast, RSFSR
 6th Combined Arms Army (6-я общевойсковая армия) - Petrozavodsk, Karelian ASSR, RSFSR
 1179th Separate Landing Assault Battalion (1179-й отдельный десантно-штурмовой батальон) - Petrozavodsk, Karelian ASSR, RSFSR
 Baltic Military District (Прибалтийский военный округ) - Riga, Latvian SSR
 37th Separate Landing Assault Brigade (37-я отдельная десантно-штурмовая бригада) - Chernyakhovsk, Kaliningrad Oblast, RSFSR
 11th Guards Combined Arms Army (11-я гвардейская общевойсковая армия) - Kaliningrad, Kaliningrad Oblast, RSFSR
 1039th Separate Landing Assault Battalion (1039-й отдельный десантно-штурмовой батальон) - Chernyakhovsk, Kaliningrad Oblast, RSFSR
 Volga Military District (Приволжский военный округ) - Kuybyshev
 none
 Central Asian Military District (Среднеазиатский военный округ) - Alma-Ata, Kazakh SSR
 57th Separate Landing Assault Brigade (57-я отдельная десантно-штурмовая бригада)(partially cadred, the HQ, one AAslt battalion, the artillery battalion and the support units active) - Aktogay, Semipalatinsk Oblast, Kazakh SSR
 Ural Military District (Уральский военный округ) - Sverdlovsk, RSFSR
 none
 Siberian Military District (Сибирский военный округ) - Novosibirsk, RSFSR
  none
note: HH is not an official designation, but denotes Helicopter-Heavy - The original three Air Assault Brigades - the 11th, 13th and 21st had their organic helicopter regiments and they have retained them until 1988~89. The brigades, which were formed later lacked own helicopter assets and relied on the helicopter regiments of their higher echelon commands.

note: The 36th Army with its 906th Separate Assault Landing Battalion and the 86th Army Corps with its 1154th Separate Assault Landing Battalion need further investigation, as the 86th Army Corps was expanded into the 36th Combined Arms Army on June 1, 1976, and could not exist simultaneously around 1989, as the Army was itself reduced into the 55th Army Corps on June 1, 1989.

Training establishments 
 Mikhailovskaya Artillery Military Academy
 Ryazan Guards Higher Airborne Command School
 44th Airborne Division, later 242nd Training Centre

Commanders of the Soviet Airborne Forces  
 Vasili Glazunov (1941–1943)
 Alexander Kapitokhin (1943–1944)
 Ivan Zatevakhin (1944–1946)
 Vasily Glagolev (1946–1947)
 Alexander Kazankin (1947–1948)
 Sergei Rudenko (1948–1949)
 Alexander Gorbatov (1950–1954)
 Vasily Margelov (1954–1959)
 Ivan Tutarinov (1959–1961)
 Vasily Margelov (1961–1979)
 Dmitri Sukhorukov (1979–1987)
Nikolai Kalinin (1987–1989)
 Vladislav Achalov (1989–1990)
 Pavel Grachev (1990–1991)
 Yevgeny Podkolzin (1991–1992)

Traditions 

The service march of the airborne forces is We Need One Victory, also known as Our 10th Parachute Battalion. It was made by poet Bulat Okudzhava, written for the feature film Belorussian Station by Andrei Smirnov (1970). It was later adapted by Alfred Schnittke to be performed as a march to be played at the Moscow Victory Day Parade on Victory Day (9 May).

Paratroopers' Day celebrations 

On Airborne Forces Day in many Russian cities, it is customary to turn off the fountains and hold veteran reunions near those fountains.

Bands 

The Combined Military Band of the Airborne Forces is an integral part of all the solemn events of the Airborne Forces. Every year, the band's personnel take part in the Victory Parade on Red Square, as well as the opening ceremony of the International Army Games. In the ranks of the combined band are musicians of the military bands of the airborne and assault formations of the Airborne Forces. There are six other military bands in the airborne forces. The Song and Dance Ensemble of the Airborne Forces is the theatrical troupe of the VDV. It began its creative activity in 1937, as the Red Army Song and Dance Ensemble of the Kiev Military District, numbering only 18 people. On 3 May 1945, three days after the signing of the German armistice, the ensemble gave a concert on the steps of the destroyed Reichstag. During the Cold War, the unit was known as the Song and Dance Ensemble of the Group of Soviet Forces in Germany. During this time, it had participated in concerts in the cities of East Germany, Czechoslovakia, and Poland. It gained its current status in 1994. The Song and Dance Ensemble also contains the Blue Berets musical group.

See also 
Awards and emblems of the Ministry of Defence of the Russian Federation

Notes

References 
 Bonn, Keith E.(ed.), Slaughterhouse: The handbook of the Eastern Front, Aberjona Press, Bedford, PA, 2005
 Brinkster.com VDV at Brinskster.com
 
 
 Glantz, David, The Soviet Airborne Experience, Research Survey No. 4, Combat Studies Institute, November 1984.
 Isby, David C., Weapons and tactics of the Soviet Army, Jane's Publishing Company, London 1988
 Schofield, Carey, The Russian Elite: Inside Spetsnaz and the Airborne Forces, Stackpole/Greenhill, 1993
 Simpkin, Richard, Red Armour: An examination of the Soviet Mobile Force Concept, Brassey's Defence Publishers, London, 1984
 Staskov, Lt. Gen. N.V., 1943 Dnepr Airborne Operation: Lessons and Conclusions, Military Thought, Vol. 12, No.4, 2003 (in Russian)
 Besedovskyy V., Uniforms and history of the Soviet Ariborne - the 345th Regiment in Afghanistan, 2021, ISBN 978-617-8064-11-2

 01
Military parachuting
Military units and formations disestablished in the 1990s